"Everlasting Love" is a 1967 single by Robert Knight, later covered by other artists, notably Love Affair and Carl Carlton.

Everlasting Love may also refer to:


Music

Albums
Everlasting Love (Vanessa Williams album), 2005
Everlasting Love (Sandra album), 1988
Everlasting Love, a 1998 album by CeCe Winans

Songs
"Everlasting Love", a song performed by Rufus featuring Chaka Khan, on their 1977 album Ask Rufus, later covered by Mary J. Blige
"Everlasting Love" (Howard Jones song), 1989
"An Everlasting Love", a 1978 single by Andy Gibb
"This Will Be (An Everlasting Love)", a 1975 single by Natalie Cole
"Everlasting Love", a song by Robin Zander from the 1993 album Robin Zander
"Everlasting Love", a song by Stephanie Mills from the 1984 album I've Got the Cure
"Everlasting Love", a song by Fifth Harmony from Reflection

Other
Everlasting Love (film), a 1984 film by Michael Mak
"An Everlasting Love" (Medium), a 2010 episode